Kiss 105-108 was an Independent local radio station serving East Anglia from the Kiss Network. All programming after 2010 was networked from the national station KISS.

Technical

FM

Suffolk, Norfolk, Cambridgeshire, North Essex 106.4 FM Mendlesham transmitting station Main Transmitter.

North East Norfolk 106.1 FM Stoke Holy Cross Filler Transmitter.

Cambridgeshire 105.6 & 107.7 FM Madingley & Gunthorpe Filler Transmitters.

The station had four transmitters in the East of England, Mendlesham transmitting station in Suffolk on 106.4 at 20KW which could be heard across Suffolk, Norfolk, Cambridgeshire and North Essex. It also had three filler transmitters provided to serve the major cities and surrounding towns. From Stoke Holy Cross near Norwich on 106.1 at 4KW to North Walsham, Wymondham and Great Yarmouth. From Madingley near Cambridge on 105.6 at 1KW to Ely, Newmarket and St Ives and Gunthorpe in Peterborough on 107.7 at a lower power of 200W, which can be heard across the whole of Greater Peterborough, Market Deeping, Crowland, Spalding, Yaxley and Whittlesey.

Kiss 105-108 could frequently be heard across South Lincolnshire, South Essex, and even the edge of Bedfordshire and Greater London, although it does not serve these areas.

DAB

Kiss 105-108 broadcast on DAB format to Cambridge, Norwich and Peterborough, however this was replaced by a national relay of Kiss 100 in 2013.

Internet

The station is streamed in the MP3 format via the "Kiss Kube" at http://kube.kissfmuk.com/

History

The station was founded by the Essex Radio Group, who at the time owned a handful of local radio stations, the largest being Essex FM (now Heart Essex). Shortly after the group was bought by Daily Mail and in 1998 acquired by DMGT.

In 2000, the Essex Radio Group concern of DMGT was purchased by the GWR Group, (now 'Global') in a joint venture with Scottish Radio Holdings (SRH). At this point in time the GWR group also acquired Galaxy 101 in Bristol (Renamed to Vibe 101) from the Chrysalis media group (now 'Global'), extending the Vibe brand to South Wales and the West. For ownership reasons, the two Vibe stations were 'owned' by Vibe Radio Holdings, a company invented by and jointly owned by GWR and SRH.
SRH bought both Vibe stations outright from GWR in 2003.

In June 2005 the EMAP group acquired SRH. Emap's radio stations and public magazines was then bought by Bauer in January 2008.

Audience figures

(source: RAJAR Q4 2013)

Kiss 105-108 is commercial market leader reaching 492,000 listeners each week

The station achieved RAJAR 11 consecutive quarterly year on year increases whilst local programmed during key dayparts (under Programme Director Glen White with Stuart Grant on the breakfast show and Michael Lewis on Drive time) from 2007 to 2010.

See also
Kiss Network
Kiss TV

References

External links
 KISS
 KissKube.com: Kiss 105-108 Live Stream & Radio Player
 Media UK
 Kiss Breakfast with Stuart Grant on Myspace (Official)
 Gunthorpe transmitter
 Madingley transmitter
 Mendlesham transmitter
 Stoke Holy Cross transmitter.

Bauer Radio
Radio stations in England
Dance radio stations
Kiss Network
Radio stations established in 2006